FC Kosmos Dolgoprudny is a professional association football club from Dolgoprudny, Russia. It made its debut in the third-highest Russian Second League in the 2022–23 season.

History
A club with the same name played professionally from 1991 to 1998 before moving to a different city. After Kosmos moved, a new club was organized in Dolgoprudny called FSC Dolgoprudny. That club eventually was promoted to the second-tier Russian Football National League as FC Olimp-Dolgoprudny for the 2021–22 season, and a farm club called FC Olimp-Dolgoprudny-2 was registered for the third tier. Following the season, Olimp-Dolgoprudny was not licensed due to financial issues, and a resurrected Kosmos, created on the base of FC Olimp-Dolgoprudny-2, was licensed for the Russian Second League.

Current squad
As of 21 February 2023, according to the Second League website.

See also
FC Saturn-2 Moscow Region

References

External links
Official website

Association football clubs established in 2022
Football clubs in Russia
Football in Moscow Oblast
2022 establishments in Russia